Beyaz Show is a popular talk show program hosted by Turkish television personality Beyazıt Öztürk (also known as Beyaz). It has been on air on Kanal D since December 1996. The program is among the highest rated television shows in Turkey. The program is in the format of host Beyaz interviewing various celebrities as well as includes segments that features his sense of humor. It was awarded as the Best Talk Show at the 34th Golden Butterfly Awards in 2007.

References

External links

 Kanal D - Program Website

Turkish television talk shows
Turkish television series
1996 Turkish television series debuts
1990s Turkish television series
Kanal D original programming
2000s Turkish television series
2010s Turkish television series
Current_Turkish_television_series
Television shows set in Istanbul
Television series produced in Istanbul